
Year 248 BC was a year of the pre-Julian Roman calendar. In the Roman Republic at the time it was known as the Year of the Consulship of Cotta and Geminus (or, less frequently, year 506 Ab urbe condita). The denomination 248 BC for this year has been used since the early medieval period, when the Anno Domini calendar era became the prevalent method in Europe for naming years.

Events 
 By place 
 China 
 The Qin general Meng Ao captures the Wei cities of Gaodu and Ji.
 Meng Ao then annexes 37 towns and cities from the State of Zhao, conquering the cities of Yuci, Xincheng and Langmeng.

 India 
 The Mauryan king Ashoka is dedicated to the propagation of Buddhism and begins establishing monuments marking several significant sites in the life of Gautama Buddha.

Births

Deaths

References